Marcel Marie Louis Haëntjens (24 June 1869 – 10 June 1915) was a French croquet player. He competed at the 1900 Summer Olympics in both the one ball singles and the two ball singles and did not finish in either.

References

External links

1869 births
1915 deaths
Olympic croquet players of France
French croquet players
Croquet players at the 1900 Summer Olympics
Sportspeople from Sarthe